Prábis is a Sector in the Biombo Region of Guinea-Bissau. In 2004 it had a population of 12,312.

Sectors of Guinea-Bissau
Populated places in Guinea-Bissau